The following lists events that happened during 1943 in Liberia.

Incumbents
President: Edwin Barclay 
Vice President: James Skivring Smith, Jr.
Chief Justice: F. E. R. Johnson

Events

May
 May 4 - A general election and constitutional referendum were held.

References

 
Years of the 20th century in Liberia
Liberia
Liberia